In Greek mythology, the name Antiochus ( derived from αντι anti "against, compared to, like" and οχη oche "support") may refer to:

Antiochus, son of Heracles and Meda. Both his maternal grandfather and his own son bore the name Phylas. He was the eponym of the Athenian phyle Antiochis.
Antiochus, one of the Aetolian eight sons of Melas who were killed by Tydeus for plotting against Oeneus.
Antiochus, a Taphian prince as one of the sons of King Pterelaus of Taphos.
Antiochus, one of the sons of Aegyptus. He married (and was killed by) Itea, daughter of Danaus.
Antiochus, one of the sacrificial victims of Minotaur.

Notes

References 

 Apollodorus, The Library with an English Translation by Sir James George Frazer, F.B.A., F.R.S. in 2 Volumes, Cambridge, MA, Harvard University Press; London, William Heinemann Ltd. 1921. ISBN 0-674-99135-4. Online version at the Perseus Digital Library. Greek text available from the same website.
Diodorus Siculus, The Library of History translated by Charles Henry Oldfather. Twelve volumes. Loeb Classical Library. Cambridge, Massachusetts: Harvard University Press; London: William Heinemann, Ltd. 1989. Vol. 3. Books 4.59–8. Online version at Bill Thayer's Web Site
 Diodorus Siculus, Bibliotheca Historica. Vol 1-2. Immanel Bekker. Ludwig Dindorf. Friedrich Vogel. in aedibus B. G. Teubneri. Leipzig. 1888-1890. Greek text available at the Perseus Digital Library.
 Gaius Julius Hyginus, Fabulae from The Myths of Hyginus translated and edited by Mary Grant. University of Kansas Publications in Humanistic Studies. Online version at the Topos Text Project.
 Pausanias, Description of Greece with an English Translation by W.H.S. Jones, Litt.D., and H.A. Ormerod, M.A., in 4 Volumes. Cambridge, MA, Harvard University Press; London, William Heinemann Ltd. 1918. . Online version at the Perseus Digital Library
Pausanias, Graeciae Descriptio. 3 vols. Leipzig, Teubner. 1903.  Greek text available at the Perseus Digital Library.

Heracleidae
Children of Heracles
Aetolian characters in Greek mythology